Slovenia is divided into 212 municipalities (Slovene: občine, singularobčina), of which 12 have urban (metropolitan) status. Municipalities are further divided into local communities and districts.

Slovene is an official language of all the municipalities. Hungarian is a second official language of three municipalities in Prekmurje: Dobrovnik/Dobronak, Hodoš/Hodos, and Lendava/Lendva. Italian is a second official language of four municipalities (of which one has urban status) in the Slovene Littoral: Ankaran/Ancarano, Izola/Isola, Koper/Capodistria, and Piran/Pirano.

In the EU statistics, the municipalities of Slovenia are classified as "local administrative unit 2" (LAU 2), below 58 administrative units, which are LAU 1.

Names
The Slovene names of the municipalities have the word Občina 'municipality' followed by a nominative form, usually the seat of the municipality; for example, Občina Ajdovščina 'Municipality of Ajdovščina'.

List of Slovenian municipalities
Slovenia is divided into 212 municipalities, of which 12 has urban status.

City municipalities

See also
ISO 3166-2:SI
NUTS:SI

References

External links
 Review of municipalities and appurtenant spatial units and house numbers, 1 January 2011. Published by the Statistical Office of the Republic of Slovenia.

 
Subdivisions of Slovenia
Slovenia, Municipalities
Slovenia 1
Municipalities, Slovenia
Slovenia geography-related lists